The Abd al-Qays was an ancient Arabian tribe from the Rabi'a branch of the North Arabian tribes.

History

Origins
The name of the tribe means 'servant of the [god] Qays'. It belonged to the tribal groups originally resident in the area of al-Arid in South Arabia and which migrated northwestward to an area extending north to Sudayr and south to al-Kharj. Later, in the Arab genealogical tradition, these tribes were called the Rabi'a, a branch of the northern Arab Ma'add confederation.

Campaigns of Shapur II
In pre-Islamic times, the Abd al-Qays frequently raided Iran. The Sasanian king Shapur II led an expedition against the Arabian tribes, during which he massacred most of the Abd al-Qays. Later, several Abd al-Qays tribesmen were relocated by Shapur to the Iranian province of Kirman.

Migrations into eastern Arabia
By the 5th century, the Abd al-Qays had shifted to nomadism, dwelling outside of the Tuwaiq escarpment in the southern Najd (central Arabia). In the 6th century, the tribe migrated northeastward the oases of al-Ahsa and Qatif in eastern Arabia.

Islamic period
During the Arab conquest of Iran, considerable numbers of Abd al-Qays tribesmen entered southeastern, launching extensive raids in the region. Several groupings of Abd al-Qays settled near Tavvaz in the Iranian coastal mountains and Basra in lower Mesopotamia. In the early 8th century, 4,000 Abd al-Qays warriors formed part of the army of Qutayba ibn Muslim on his campaign into Khorasan.

There are many gaps and inconsistencies in the genealogies of Abd al-Qays in Bahrain, thus Baharna are probably descendants of an ethnically mixed population.

Religion
Abd al-Qays were mostly Christians before the advent of Islam.

Sources

Bibliography

 
History of the Arabian Peninsula
Rabi`ah
Tribes of Arabia